Bedford Hills station is a commuter rail stop on the Metro-North Railroad's Harlem Line, located in Bedford, New York.  It is located next to the downtown business district, which was developed around the station.

When the New York and Harlem Railroad was built though the community in 1847, Bedford Hills was known as Bedford Station. This name stood until 1910. The former station, influenced by the design cues of Henry Hobson Richardson and built by the New York Central Railroad in the late-19th century, stands aside the current one and, unusually for surviving NYC stations along the Harlem Line, still has its sign. But like many others, it has found new life as a home for local businesses.

Station layout
The station has one six-car-long high-level island platform serving trains in both directions.

Notes

References

External links

 Bedford Hills Metro-North station (The SubwayNut)
 Station from Google Maps Street View

Metro-North Railroad stations in New York (state)
Railway stations in Westchester County, New York
Former New York Central Railroad stations
Railway stations in the United States opened in 1847
Transportation in Westchester County, New York
1847 establishments in New York (state)